Tudulinna Parish was an Estonian municipality located in Ida-Viru County. It had a population of 629 (2006) and an area of 270 km².

Populated places 
 Small borough
Tudulinna

 Villages
Kellassaare, Lemmaku, Oonurme, Peressaare, Pikati, Rannapungerja, Roostoja, Sahargu, Tagajõe.

References

External links 
  

Former municipalities of Estonia